Yang Ya-yi (born 30 May 2004) is a Taiwanese tennis player.

Yang has a career-high singles ranking by the Women's Tennis Association (WTA) of 510, achieved on 9 January 2023.

She represents the colours of Chinese Taipei in the Fed Cup.

Junior career
Junior Grand Slam results - Singles:
 Australian Open: 2R (2020)
 French Open: –
 Wimbledon: –
 US Open: 1R (2021)

Junior Grand Slam results - Doubles:
 Australian Open: 2R (2020)
 French Open: –
 Wimbledon: –
 US Open: 1R (2021)

ITF Circuit finals

Singles: 4 (2 titles, 2 runner-ups)

Doubles: 5 (3 titles, 2 runner-ups)

References

External links
 
 
 

2004 births
Living people
Taiwanese female tennis players
Sportspeople from Keelung
21st-century Taiwanese women